The Zapatista Army of National Liberation (EZLN), often referred to as the Zapatistas (Mexican ), is a far-left political and militant group that controls a substantial amount of territory in Chiapas, the southernmost state of Mexico.

Since 1994, the group has been nominally at war with the Mexican state (although it may be described at this point as a frozen conflict). The EZLN used a strategy of civil resistance. The Zapatistas' main body is made up of mostly rural indigenous people, but it includes some supporters in urban areas and internationally. The EZLN's main spokesperson is Subcomandante Insurgente Galeano, previously known as Subcomandante Marcos (a.k.a. Compañero Galeano and Delegate Zero in relation to "the Other Campaign"). Unlike other Zapatista spokespeople, Marcos is not an indigenous Maya.

The group takes its name from Emiliano Zapata, the agrarian revolutionary and commander of the Liberation Army of the South during the Mexican Revolution, and sees itself as his ideological heir.

EZLN's ideology has been characterized as libertarian socialist, anarchist, Marxist, and having roots in liberation theology although the Zapatistas have rejected and defied political classification. The EZLN aligns itself with the wider alter-globalization, anti-neoliberal social movement, seeking indigenous control over local resources, especially land. Since their 1994 uprising was countered by the Mexican Armed Forces, the EZLN has abstained from military offensives and adopted a new strategy that attempts to garner Mexican and international support.

Organization
The Zapatistas describe themselves as a decentralized organization. The pseudonymous Subcomandante Marcos is widely considered its leader despite his claims that the group has no single leader. Political decisions are deliberated and decided in community assemblies. Military and organizational matters are decided by the Zapatista area elders who compose the General Command (Revolutionary Indigenous Clandestine Committee – General Command, or CCRI-CG).

History

Background
The Chiapas region has been the scene of a succession of uprisings, including the "Caste War" or "Chamula Rebellion" (1867–1870) and the "Pajarito War" (1911).

The EZLN emerged during the government of the Institutional Revolutionary Party (PRI), which at the time had ruled Mexico for more than sixty years, in a dominant-party system. The situation led many young people to consider the legal channels of political participation closed and to bet on the formation of clandestine armed organizations to seek the overthrow of a regime that from their point of view was authoritarian, and thus improve the living conditions of the population. One of these organizations, was known as the National Liberation Forces (FLN). The FLN were founded on August 6, 1969, by César Germán Yáñez Muñoz, in Monterrey, Nuevo León. According to Mario Arturo Acosta Chaparro, in his report Subversive movements in Mexico, "they had established their areas of operations in the states of Veracruz, Puebla, Tabasco, Nuevo León and Chiapas."

As a consequence of this confrontation, the FLN lost its operational capacity. In the early 1980s, some of its militants decided to found a new organization. Thus, the Zapatista Army of National Liberation (EZLN) was founded on November 17, 1983, by non-indigenous members of the FLN from Mexico's urban north and by indigenous inhabitants of the remote Las Cañadas/Selva Lacandona regions in eastern Chiapas, by members of former rebel movements. Over the years, the group slowly grew, building on social relations among the indigenous base and making use of an organizational infrastructure created by peasant organizations and the Catholic Church (see Liberation theology). In the 1970s, through the efforts of the Roman Catholic Diocese of San Cristóbal de Las Casas, most indigenous communities in the Lacandon forest were already politically active and had practice in dealing with governmental agencies and local officials. Specifically in 1974 the indigenous conference brought indigenous peoples from across Chiapas together to discuss their conditions. Promoted and organized by the Catholic church, this event helped foster an indigenous political identity in the region. In the 1980s, they joined with the Rural Collective Interest Association--"Unión de Uniones," (ARIC-UU). However, disputes over strategy in the Chiapas would lead to the EZLN taking on over half of the ARIC-UU's membership in the early 1990s.

1990s

The Zapatista Army went public on January 1, 1994, releasing their declaration on the day the North American Free Trade Agreement (NAFTA) came into effect. On that day, they issued their First Declaration and Revolutionary Laws from the Lacandon Jungle. The declaration amounted to a declaration of war on the Mexican government, which they considered illegitimate. The EZLN stressed that it opted for armed struggle due to the lack of results that had been achieved through peaceful means of protest (such as sit-ins and marches).

Their initial goal was to instigate a revolution against the rise of neoliberalism throughout Mexico, but since no such revolution occurred, they used their uprising as a platform to call attention to their movement to protest the signing of the NAFTA, which the EZLN believed would increase inequality in Chiapas. Prior to the signing of NAFTA, however, dissent amongst indigenous peasants was already on the rise in 1992 with the amendment of Article 27 of the Constitution. The amendment called for the end of land reform and the regularizing of all landholdings, which ended land redistribution in Mexico. The end of land distribution heralded the end of many communities that had been growing of the past decade, as they had been waiting for further distribution that was on an agrarian backlog according to the government.

The Zapatistas hosted the Intercontinental Encounter for Humanity and Against Neoliberalism to help initiate a united platform for other anti-neoliberal groups. The EZLN also called for greater democratization of the Mexican government, which had been controlled by the Partido Revolucionario Institucional (Institutional Revolutionary Party, also known as PRI) for 65 years, and for land reform mandated by the 1917 Constitution of Mexico, which had been repealed in 1991. The Zapatistas had mentioned “independence” among their initial demands;however, it received little systematic treatment from the EZLN until the extensive contact between the Zapatistas and other indigenous organizations during the San Andrés negotiations and use of natural resources normally extracted from Chiapas. It also advocated for protection from violence and political inclusion of Chiapas' indigenous communities.

On January 1, 1994, an estimated 3,000 armed Zapatista insurgents seized six towns and cities in the Chiapas highlands. The Zapatistas soon retreated to the forest to avoid a federal military offensive.

"The EZLN listed a series of other demands that were a compendium of long-standing grievances of the indigenous communities of Chiapas, but also found echo in broad sectors of Mexican society outside of Chiapas: work, land, housing, food, healthcare, education, independence, liberty, democracy, justice, and peace."

Following a ceasefire on January 12, peace talks commenced later in the month between Catholic bishop Samuel Ruiz for the Zapatistas and former mayor of Mexico City, Manuel Camacho Solis, for the state.

Military offensive

Arrest-warrants were made for Marcos, Javier Elorriaga Berdegue, Silvia Fernández Hernández, Jorge Santiago, Fernando Yanez, German Vicente and other Zapatistas. At that point, in the Lacandon Jungle, the Zapatista Army of National Liberation was under military siege by the Mexican Army. Javier Elorriaga was captured on February 9, 1995, by forces from a military garrison at Gabina Velázquez in the town of Las Margaritas, and was later taken to the Cerro Hueco prison in Tuxtla Gutiérrez, Chiapas. On February 11, 1995, the PGR informed the country that the government had implemented an operation in the State of México, where they had captured 14 people presumed to be involved with the Zapatistas, of which eight had already being turned over to the judicial authorities, they had also seized an important arsenal. The PGR threatened the San Cristóbal de Las Casas' Catholic Bishop, Samuel Ruiz García, with arrest. Claiming that they helped conceal the Zapatistas' guerrilla uprising, although their activities had been reported years before in Proceso, a Mexican leftist magazine. It is likely however that the Mexican Government knew about the uprising but failed to act. This adversely impacted Holy See–Mexico relations.

In response to the siege of the EZLN, Esteban Moctezuma, the interior minister, submitted his resignation to President Zedillo, which Zedillo refused to accept. Influenced by Moctezuma's protest, President Zedillo abandoned the military offensive in favor of a diplomatic approach. The Mexican army eased its operation in Chiapas, allowing Marcos to escape the military perimeter in the Lacandon Jungle. Responding to the change of conditions, friends of the EZLN along with Subcomandante Marcos prepared a report for under-Secretary of the Interior Luis Maldonado Venegas; the Secretary of the Interior Esteban Moctezuma and then President Zedillo. The document stressed Marcos' natural pacifist inclination and an unwillingness to get caught in a bloody war. The document also said that the marginalized groups and the radical left that existed in Mexico supported the Zapatista movement. It also stressed that Marcos maintained an open negotiating track.

2000s
In April 2000, Vicente Fox, the presidential candidate for the opposition National Action Party (PAN), sent a new proposal for dialogue to Subcomandante Marcos, without obtaining a response. In May, a group of civilians attacked two indigenous people from the autonomous municipality of Polhó, Chiapas. Members of the Federal Police were sent to guarantee the security of the area. The Zapatista coordinators and several non-governmental organizations described it as "a clear provocation to the EZLN."

Vicente Fox was elected president in 2001 (the first non-PRI president of Mexico in over 70 years) and, as one of his first actions, urged the EZLN to enter into dialogue with the federal government. However, the EZLN insisted that it would not return to peace negotiations with the government until seven military positions were closed. Fox subsequently made the decision to withdraw the army from the conflict zone, so all the military located in Chiapas began to leave the area. Following this gesture, Subcomandante Marcos agreed to initiate dialogue with the Vicente Fox government, but shortly thereafter demanded conditions for peace; especially, that the federal government disarm the PRI paramilitary groups in the area. The Zapatistas marched on Mexico City to pressure the Mexican Congress and formed the Zapatista Information Center, through which information would be exchanged about the trip of the guerrilla delegation to Mexico City, and mobilizations would be articulated to demand compliance with the conditions of the EZLN for dialogue. Although Fox had stated earlier that he could end the conflict "in fifteen minutes", the EZLN rejected the agreement and created 32 new "autonomous municipalities" in Chiapas. They would then unilaterally implement their demands without government support, although they had some funding from international organizations.

On June 28, 2005, the Zapatistas presented the Sixth Declaration of the Lacandon Jungle declaring their principles and vision for Mexico and the world. This declaration reiterated the support for the indigenous peoples, who make up roughly one-third of the population of Chiapas, and extended the cause to include "all the exploited and dispossessed of Mexico". It also expressed the movement's sympathy to the international alter-globalization movement and supported leftists governments in Cuba, Bolivia, Ecuador, and elsewhere, with whom they felt there was common cause.

On May 3–4, 2006, a series of demonstrations protested the forcible removal of irregular flower vendors from a lot in Texcoco for the construction of a Walmart branch. The protests turned violent when state police and the Federal Preventive Police bused in some 5,000 agents to San Salvador Atenco and the surrounding communities. A local organization called the People's Front in Defense of the Land, which adheres to the Sixth Declaration, called in support from other regional and national adherent organizations. "Delegate Zero" and his "Other Campaign" were at the time in nearby Mexico City, having just organized May Day events there, and quickly arrived at the scene. The following days were marked by violence, with some 216 arrests, over 30 rape and sexual abuse accusations against the police, five deportations, and one casualty, a 14-year-old boy named Javier Cortes shot by a policeman. A 20-year-old UNAM economics student, Alexis Benhumea, died on the morning of June 7, 2006, after being in a coma caused by a blow to the head from a tear-gas grenade launched by police. Most of the resistance organizing was done by the EZLN and Sixth Declaration adherents, and Delegate Zero stated that the "Other Campaign" tour would be temporarily halted until all prisoners were released.

In late 2006 and early 2007, the Zapatistas (through Subcomandante Marcos), along with other indigenous peoples of the Americas, announced the Intercontinental Indigenous Encounter. They invited indigenous people from throughout the Americas and the rest of the world to gather on October 11–14, 2007, near Guaymas, Sonora. The declaration for the conference designated this date because of "515 years since the invasion of ancient Indigenous territories and the onslaught of the war of conquest, spoils and capitalist exploitation". Comandante David said in an interview, "The object of this meeting is to meet one another and to come to know one another's pains and sufferings. It is to share our experiences, because each tribe is different."

The Third Encuentro of the Zapatistas People with the People of the World was held from December 28, 2007, through January 1, 2008.

In mid-January 2009, Marcos made a speech on behalf of the Zapatistas in which he supported the resistance of the Palestinians as "the Israeli government's heavily trained and armed military continues its march of death and destruction". He described the actions of the Israeli government as a "classic military war of conquest". He said, "The Palestinian people will also resist and survive and continue struggling and will continue to have sympathy from below for their cause."

2010s 
On December 21, 2012, tens of thousands of EZLN supporters marched silently through five cities in the state of Chiapas: Ocosingo, Las Margaritas, Palenque, Altamirano and San Cristóbal. Hours after the march, a communiqué from the CCRI-CG was released in the form of a poem, signed by the Subcomandante Marcos. This mobilization, which included the participation of around 40 thousand Zapatistas, was the largest since the 1994 uprising. Of this number, "La Jornada" estimated that half would have marched through the streets of San Cristóbal de las Casas, 7,000 in Las Margaritas and 8,000 in Palenque; for its part El País calculated that San Cristóbal would have seen the concentration of some 10 thousand participants.

Beyond the number of people, the silence with which they marched and the lack of an opening or closing speech were the elements that marked this action. The poet and journalist Hermann Bellinghausen, specialist in coverage of the movement, ended his chronicle in this way: 

The Zapatistas invited the world to a three-day fiesta to celebrate ten years of Zapatista autonomy in August 2013 in the five caracoles of Chiapas. They expected 1,500 international activists to attend the event, titled the Little School of Liberty.

In June 2015, the EZLN reported that there was aggression against indigenous people in El Rosario, Chiapas; The report, signed by Subcomandante Moisés, indicated that the attack occurred that same month and year. In addition, there was a complaint by the Las Abejas Civil Society Organization that stated that an indigenous Tzotzil person was assassinated on June 23 on 2015.

In 2016, at the National Indigenous Congress, the EZLN agreed to select a candidate to represent them in the 2018 Mexican general election. This decision broke the Zapatista's two-decade tradition of rejecting Mexican electoral politics. In May 2017, María de Jesús Patricio Martínez, a woman of Mexican and Nahua heritage, was selected to stand, but she was unable to gather the 866,000 signatures required to appear on the ballot.

At the end of August 2019, Subcomandante Insurgente Galeano announced the expansion of EZLN into 11 more districts. In response, President Andrés Manuel López Obrador stated that this expansion was welcome, provided it was done without violence.

2020s
The EZLN has made opposition to mega-infrastructure projects in the region a major priority. In 2020, it announced the Journey for Life and in 2021, Zapatistas visited various activist groups in Europe.

Ideology 

The ideology of the Zapatista movement, Neozapatismo, synthesizes Mayan tradition with elements of libertarian socialism, anarchism, Catholic liberation theology and Marxism. The historical influence of Mexican anarchists and various Latin American socialists is apparent in Neozapatismo. The positions of Subcomandante Marcos add a Marxist element to the movement. A Zapatista slogan is in harmony with the concept of mutual aid: "For everyone, everything. For us, nothing" (Para todos todo, para nosotros nada).

The EZLN opposes economic globalization, arguing that it severely and negatively affects the peasant life of its indigenous support base and oppresses people worldwide. The signing of NAFTA also resulted in the removal of Article 27, Section VII, from the Mexican Constitution, which had guaranteed land reparations to indigenous groups throughout Mexico through collective land tenure.

Postcolonialism

Postcolonialism scholars have argued that the Zapatistas' response to the introduction of NAFTA in 1994 may have reflected a shift in perception taking place in societies that have experienced colonialism.

The Zapatistas have used organizations like the United Nations Economic and Social Council (ECOSOC) to raise awareness for their rebellion and indigenous rights, and what they claim is the Mexican government's lack of respect for the country's impoverished and marginalized populations. Appealing to the ECOSOC and other non-governmental bodies may have allowed the Zapatistas to establish a sense of autonomy by redefining their identities both as indigenous people and as citizens of Mexico.

Religion 
The Zapatista movement is outwardly secular, and does not have an official religion. However, the overarching Zapatista movement has been influenced by liberation theology and its proponents. The organization established early on that it "has no ties with any Catholic religious authorities nor authorities of any other creed."

In the decades preceding the 1994 uprising, the Roman Catholic Diocese of San Cristóbal de Las Casas, guided by the Bishop Samuel Ruiz Garcia, developed a cadre of indigenous catechists. In practice, these liberationist Christian catechists promoted political awareness, established organizational structures, and helped raise progressive sentiment among indigenous communities in Chiapas. The organization of these catechists and events such as the 1974 Indigenous Congress laid much of the ideological and often organizational groundwork for the EZLN to unite many indigenous communities under a banner of liberation. Further, many of these indigenous catechists later joined and organized within the EZLN.

Anthropologists Duncan Earle and Jeanne Simonelli assert that the liberationist Catholicism spread by the aforementioned catechists which emphasized helping the poor and addressing material conditions in tandem with spiritual ones brought many indigenous Catholics into the Zapatista Movement. Beyond just the Zapatistas, the blossoming indigenous resistance and identity of the late 20th century saw a broader indigenous movement based in indigenous liberationist Christianity. One such group in the broader movement is Las Abejas, an ecumenical Christian organization. Supported, but not controlled by the Diocese of San Cristobal, Las Abejas is dedicated to nonviolence, but shares sympathies and solidarity for the aims of the Zapatistas. Due to their ties to the Zapatistas, 45 Las Abejas members were killed in the Acteal Massacre in 1997.

Communications 

The EZLN has placed a high priority on forging communication with the rest of Mexico and the world. Marcos and the Zapatistas would issue hundreds of missives, hold encuentros (mass meetings), give numerous interviews, meet high-profile public and literary figures including Oliver Stone, Naomi Klein, Gael García Bernal, Danielle Mitterrand, Régis Debray, John Berger, Eduardo Galeano, Gabriel García Márquez, José Saramago and Manuel Vázquez Montalbán, participate in symposia and colloquia, deliver speeches, host visits by thousands of national and international activists, and participate in two marches that toured much of the country. Media organizations from North and South America, as well as from many European and several Asian nations, have granted press coverage to the movement and its spokesperson. The EZLN's writings have been translated into at least 14 different languages and Marcos, according to journalist Jorge Alonso, had by 2016 been the subject of ′over 10,000 citations...in the academic world′.

Horizontal autonomy and indigenous leadership

Zapatista communities build and maintain their own health, education, and sustainable agro-ecological systems, promote equitable gender relations via Women's Revolutionary Law, and build international solidarity through humble outreach and non-imposing political communication, in addition to their focus on building "a world where many worlds fit". The Zapatista struggle re-gained international attention in May 2014 with the death of teacher and education promoter "Teacher Galeano" (a self chosen name honoring anti-capitalist author Eduardo Galeano), who was murdered in an attack on a Zapatista school and health clinic led by local paramilitaries. In the weeks that followed, thousands of Zapatistas and national and international sympathizers mobilized and gathered to honor Galeano. This event also saw the unofficial spokesperson of the Zapatistas, Subcomandante Marcos, announce that he would be stepping down.

Legacy 

The American rock band Rage Against the Machine released two songs in support of the EZLN, "People of the Sun" (1996) and "Zapata's Blood" (1997).

Notable members 
Subcomandante Elisa
Comandanta Esther
Subcomandante Insurgente Galeano, previously known as Subcomandante Marcos
Comandanta Ramona

See also

Rebel Autonomous Zapatista Municipalities
A Place Called Chiapas, a documentary on the Zapatistas and Subcomandante Marcos
Chiapas conflict
Himno Zapatista, anthem of the Zapatistas
Popular Revolutionary Army
Index of Mexico-related articles
Indigenous movements in the Americas
Indigenous peoples of Mexico
Movement for Peace with Justice and Dignity
San Andrés Accords
Zapatismo
Zapatista coffee cooperatives
Women in the EZLN

References

Footnotes

Bibliography
 
 (Ed.) Ponce de Leon, J. (2001). Our Word Is Our Weapon: Selected Writings, Subcomandante Marcos. New York: Seven Stories Press. .
 
 
 Conant, J. (2010). A Poetics of Resistance: The Revolutionary Public Relations of the Zapatista Insurgency. Oakland: AK Press. .
 Klein, H. (2015). Compañeras: Zapatista Women's Stories. New York: Seven Stories Press. .

Further reading

 Castellanos, L. (2007). México Armado: 1943-1981. Epilogue and chronology by Alejandro Jiménez Martín del Campo. México: Biblioteca ERA. 383 pp.  
 Dylan Eldredge Fitzwater, The Zapatista Institutions of Autonomy and their Social Implications, 2021
 Patrick & Ballesteros Corona, Carolina (1998). Cuninghame, "The Zapatistas and Autonomy", Capital & Class, No. 66, Autumn, pp 12–22.
 
 The Zapatista Reader edited by Tom Hayden 2002 A wide sampling of notable writing on the subject. 
 Khasnabish, Alex (2010). Zapatistas: Rebellion from the Grassroots to the Global. London and New York: Zed Books. .
 Klein, Hilary. (2015) Compañeras: Zapatista Women's Stories. Seven Stories Press. 
  (Eds.) Holloway, John and Peláez, Eloína (1998). Zapatista! Reinventing Revolution in Mexico. London: Pluto Press. .
 
 Mentinis, Mihalis (2006). Zapatistas: The Chiapas Revolt and what it means for Radical Politics. London: Pluto Press. .
 Muñoz Ramírez, Gloria (2008). The Fire and the Word: A History of the Zapatista Movement. San Francisco: City Lights Publishers. .
 
 Ross, John (1995). Rebellion from the Roots: Indian Uprising in Chiapas. Monroe, ME.: Common Courage Press. .
 Ross, John (2000). The War Against Oblivion: the Zapatista Chronicles 1994–2000. Monroe, ME: Common Courage Press. .
 Ross, John (2006). ¡Zapatistas! Making Another World Possible: Chronicles of Resistance 2000–2006. New York: Nation Books. .
 Subcomandante Marcos (2016). Critical Thought in the Face of the Capitalist Hydra. Durham, NC: Paperboat Press. . 
 Subcomandante Marcos (2018). The Zapatistas’ Dignified Rage: Final Public Speeches of Subcommander Marcos. Nick Henck (ed.) and Henry Gales (trans.). Chico, CA.: AK Press. .

External links

 
EZLN Communiques (1994–2004) translated into English
Archives of the Zapatista Army of National Liberation at Stanford University

 
Military units and formations established in 1983
1983 establishments in Mexico
Far-left politics in Mexico
Libertarian socialist organizations
Indigenous rights organizations in North America
Anti-capitalist organizations
Indigenous politics in North America